Edward Lee Foster (June 25, 1885 – March 1, 1929), nicknamed "Slim", was a Major League Baseball pitcher who played for one season. He pitched in six games for the Cleveland Naps during the 1908 Cleveland Naps season, starting one game and finishing five.

External links

1885 births
1929 deaths
Major League Baseball pitchers
Cleveland Naps players
Baseball players from Tennessee
Columbus River Snipes players
Brunswick River Snipes players
Jacksonville Jays players
New Haven Prairie Hens players
New Haven Murlins players
Charleston Sea Gulls players
Macon Peaches players
St. Paul Saints (AA) players
San Antonio Bronchos players
Waco Navigators players